Saltillo Soccer Fútbol Club is a Mexican football club from Saltillo, Coahuila that plays in the Liga TDP.

History
Since 1991, businessman Jorge Lankenau Rocha, owner of Grupo Financiero Abaco, had bought C.F. Monterrey with immediate results, obtaining the title of the 1991–92 Copa México, the runner-up in 1992–92 Primera División and the championship of the 1993 CONCACAF Cup Winners Cup.

During 1995, C.F. Monterrey continued to achieve success in all divisions of Mexican Soccer, and having a very complete squad of players and basic forces, the Club decided to buy the recently created Halcones de Aguascalientes franchise that played in Primera División "A", league prelude to the First Division of Mexican Soccer and moves the franchise to the neighboring city of Saltillo, Coahuila taking as a base of players some young people who had recently won the Third Division championship and incorporated some experienced players. This is how the players, instead of being promoted to the Segunda División, rose to the Primera "A" and that was how in August 1995 the Saltillo Soccer football team was founded.

The first game of Saltillo Soccer was a friendly match played in a crowded Saltillo Olympic Stadium in August 1995 against his older brother Rayados de Monterrey, where the score was 1-0 in favor of the local team, where the first goal in the history of the franchise was scored by Daniel “El Topo” Moguel. The nickname of Los Coyotes del Saltillo Soccer had been created and during the following tournaments the team consolidated itself in the league, achieving the first victories and increasing its roots in the city. The first idol of the fans was the Argentine Ariel Hernan "El Mago" Mangiantini, who quickly became the team's top scorer and positioned himself as the favorite player of the Saltillo. Another of Saltillo Soccer's favorite players in the first season was Carlos Augusto Gomes de Oliveira “Guto” who led the Coyotes midfield.

Managers such as Jose Luis Castillo, José "Pepe" Treviño, Francisco Avilán, Jorge Vantolrá and Magdaleno Cano paraded during the first years within the team. For the 1996-97 season, a large number of foreign players came to the team who soon revolutionized the team, among them defenders Carlos Amaral, Renato Ferreira, midfielder Antonio Naelson "Sinha" and forward Edson Zwaricz who became the scorer. of the team and who led the team to its first qualification to the league, scoring the famous goal against the Tigres UANL at the Estadio Universitario, shutting up all the fans of Tigres in the Primera "A" classic. The staff continued to be based on those young people who achieved promotion in 1995, including the Chabrand brothers, Julio Cesar “El Negro” García, Eliud Ruiz, Óscar Dautt, César Adame, Joel de León, Carlos “El Chino” Flores and Erick Hernandez.

Derived from the great tournament that the newcomers foreign players had, the Rayados de Monterrey decide to promote the majority of them to the first team, in addition to the young Óscar Dautt and Erick Hernández and reinforcing the Saltillo Soccer squad with some young people such as Ramón Morales, Sergio “El Alvin” Perez, Lucas Ayala, Hashim Suarez, Omar Gómez, Juan de Dios Ibarra and the African born in Sierra Leone Abdul Thompson Conteh.

Those were the glory years for Saltillo Soccer, which was a nationally recognized team, a crowd that filled the stadium Saturday to Saturday at 3:00 p.m., a uniform that was demanded by all the local fans and some players who felt the “S ”On the shirt.

During the year 1998 the businessman and owner of the Saltillo Soccer team Jorge Lankenau Rocha began to have financial and legal problems, when he was accused of fraud in banking operations, said crisis touched football, and Saltillo Soccer was quickly affected, already that since there were not enough resources in the Group, it was decided to dismantle the team of players to promote them to the Rayados de Monterrey first team, leaving only the young people who came from basic forces in the Institution. During the following tournaments, the team was always in the lower-middle part of the general table, ceasing to classify league groups and losing fans when seeing that their best players year after year went to the first team.

The Rayados de Monterrey were rescued by the FEMSA company and within the financial restructuring, the Saltillo Soccer team in the summer of 2001 ceased to exist, since the following soccer year Monterrey and the Tigres decided to exchange franchises, the Saltillo Soccer went to Ciudad Juárez to revive the Ciudad Juárez Cobras and the feline affiliate moved to the capital of Coahuila to give life to the Tigrillos U.A.N.L. Saltillo, who from scratch began to have fans and even reached a final against Real San Luis where they lost it on the global scoreboard and lost the opportunity to lead a Saltillo team to the First National Division. The Tigrillos Saltillo team dissolved in 2013.

It was not until 2015 that a businessman from the city together with a group of soccer people sought to retake the franchise, name and brand of Saltillo Soccer, the only team in the history of the city that had been successful and rooted in the fans. over the years. And that's how he sought control of the brand and invested in a franchise of the Liga TDP, third division. On September 13, the club again played an official match, drawing 2–2 with Correcaminos UAT. In the 2017–18 and 2018–19 seasons, the team made it to the quarterfinal round of the promotion playoffs.

The project was gaining strength seeking to support local and regional youth with the dream of reaching the Liga MX. During the years from 2016 to 2019 the training project was consolidated, the football results were arriving, the classification to the Liguilla was obtained in several tournaments and the return of the fans to the Saltillo Olympic Stadium was retaken, new young people who were interested the project accompanied by the fans that gave birth to the team in the nineties.

In the Torneo Clausura 2017, Saltillo Soccer took over the Titanes de Saltillo franchise that played in the Second Division, but at the end of the season it was relegated and was dissolved to make way for Atlético Saltillo Soccer. In 2019 Saltillo Soccer and Atlético Saltillo Soccer jointly created Saltillo F.C. to compete in Serie A de México. However, Saltillo Soccer continued to compete on its own but maintaining close relationships with the new club.

The year 2019 was key for the Saltillo Soccer team, since a serious project began to be structured under the responsibility of local businessman Salvador Rodríguez, who, under the advice of Jorge Urdiales, former president of the Rayados de Monterrey, created an administrative and financial structure. and soccer that under the command of Joel de León, a former Saltillo Soccer player in the nineties, a team full of quality players was created. The Saltillo Soccer Coyotes became the team to beat within the TDP League and the support of the fans was manifested in the stands and social networks. The nostalgia of seeing the Saltillo Soccer team with the "S" on the entire chest of the uniform was a key point for the hope of having a professional soccer team in the city. During the 2019-2020 season, the team quickly positioned itself in the first place of group 12 and in the first national place of the TDP League, scoring goals Saturday to Saturday and displaying a football level much higher than the other teams. This success managed to attract the attention of several businessmen and in the midst of a pandemic that affected all levels of soccer in the world instead of retreating, this group of businessmen decided to invest and commit to the Saltillo Soccer team who were heading directly to the Liguilla in search of promotion. During 2020, local businessmen Pedro Manuel González, Luis Fernando Villarreal Ortiz, Luis and Hector Fermin Carmona, Rodrigo Garza Villarreal, Victor Moahamar and Juan Carlos Segura joined the team. In addition to two other businessmen who had a media and sports impact, the former Rayados de Monterrey soccer player Walter Ayovi and the television host Omar Reyes better known as “Faisy” who, thanks to the friendship with other businessmen and the quality of the project that formed they joined the Saltillo Soccer Coyotes.

The new project gave immediate results, the contracts of new sponsors, the sale of the broadcast of the games on television to the Multimedios network, the most modern logo change, the sale of T-shirts with the “S” on the chest and the return from the fans in the middle of the COVID-19 pandemic to the stadium would corroborate it. These good results were taken to the field, since the Saltillo Soccer team would qualify in first place in the national TDP above 91 teams and positioning themselves as the favorite to get promotion. However, luck was not on their side in the TDP League draw, since in less than 6 days the team had to travel twice to the state of Sonora, after 23 hours on the road they faced Guaymas FC obtaining the result from home on Thursday in the first leg and by Sunday the team was already back to finish qualifying. However, the next day they had to travel again to the state of Sonora now to face Etchojoa where in the first leg they lost 1-0 and in the return match in Saltillo they could not take advantage of the early 1-0 lead and in the Last minutes the game was tied, thus ending the dream of promotion after the perfect season.

Honours

Amateur
 Tercera División de México (1): 1994–1995

See also
Football in Mexico
Real Saltillo Soccer
Titanes de Saltillo
Saltillo F.C.

References

External links
Forum Real Saltillo 

Association football clubs established in 1994
Football clubs in Coahuila
1994 establishments in Mexico
Saltillo